Jara Brishtite Bhijechhilo  is a Bengali film based on Joy Goswami's story Jara Brishtite Bhijechhilo, released in 2007. The film was directed by Anjan Das and stars Indrani Halder, Anjana Basu, Sudip Mukherjee, Alokananda Roy and Joy Sengupta.

Indrani Haldar was awarded the best actress award at the Madrid International Film Festival (Spain) for her role. She plays a woman who walks out of marriage after being subjected to repeated marital rape and starts living her life on her own terms with her poet/lover.

See also
Faltu

References

External links

2007 films
Bengali-language Indian films
2000s Bengali-language films
2007 drama films
Films set in Kolkata
Films about rape in India
Films about women in India
Films based on short fiction